Brigadier General Joseph B. Starker (29 January 1929 – 19 July 1975) was a United States Army aviator who served in the conflicts in Korea and Vietnam. He commanded the 11th Combat Aviation Battalion, 17th Aviation Group, and Combat Developments Experimentation Command. He was struck and killed by a drunk driver while serving as the Assistant Division Commander, 1st Cavalry Division.

Army aviator
As a member of the Howze Board, Starker helped develop the concept of the Air Cavalry Combat Brigade. Later, he was key in the design, organization and testing of the Air Cavalry Combat Brigade. General William E. DePuy, then commander of the 1st Infantry Division, wanted to assign aviation elements to support ground infantry units fighting in Vietnam. Starker's 11th Aviation Battalion was assigned as the test vehicle of this new fighting concept; initially with one assault helicopter company assigned to each U.S. brigade.

Awards
During Brigadier General Starker's distinguished career, he earned the Silver Star, Distinguished Flying Cross, Bronze Star Medal with Valor device and the Air Medal with Valor device.

References

University of Houston alumni
1929 births
1975 deaths
United States Army generals
United States Army aviators
United States Army personnel of the Vietnam War
United States Army personnel of the Korean War
Recipients of the Silver Star
Recipients of the Air Medal
Recipients of the Distinguished Flying Cross (United States)
Road incident deaths in Texas
Pedestrian road incident deaths
Burials at Fort Sam Houston National Cemetery